1866 Sisyphus  is a binary stony asteroid, near-Earth object and the largest member of the Apollo group, approximately 7 kilometers in diameter.

It was discovered on 5 December 1972, by Swiss astronomer Paul Wild at Zimmerwald Observatory near Bern, Switzerland, and given the provisional designation . It was named after Sisyphus from Greek mythology.

Orbit and classification 

This S-type asteroid (composed of rocky silicates) orbits the Sun in the inner main-belt at a distance of 0.9–2.9 AU once every 2 years and 7 months (952 days). Its orbit has an eccentricity of 0.54 and an inclination of 41° with respect to the ecliptic.

It will pass  from Earth on 24 November 2071, and will peak at roughly apparent magnitude 9.3 on 26 November 2071. When it was discovered it peaked at magnitude 9.0 on 25 November 1972. It is one of the brightest near-Earth asteroids.

Physical characteristics 

In the SMASS classification, Sisyphus is a common stony S-type asteroid.

Binary system 

In 1985, this object was detected with radar from the Arecibo Observatory at a distance of 0.25 AU. The measured radar cross-section was 8 square kilometers. During the radar observations, a small minor-planet moon was detected around Sisyphus, although its existence was not reported until December 2007. Robert Stephens confirmed that it is a suspected binary, and Brian Warner added additional weight to this conclusion, giving  hours as the satellite's orbital period, longer than the 25 hours previously reported by Stephens.

Diameter and albedo 

With a measured mean diameter in the range of 5.7–8.9 kilometers, it is the largest of the Earth-crossing asteroids, comparable in size to the Chicxulub object whose impact contributed to the extinction of the dinosaurs. Larger near-Earth asteroids which are neither classified as Apollos nor Earth-crossers include 1036 Ganymed (32 km), 3552 Don Quixote (19 km), 433 Eros (17 km), and 4954 Eric (10.8 km).

Naming 

This minor planet is named after Sisyphus from Greek mythology and refers to the cruel king of Ephyra, punished by being given the task of rolling a large stone up to a hill in the underworld, only to have it roll down again each time he neared the top. The official  was published by the Minor Planet Center on 20 December 1974.

Notes

References

External links 
  
 Asteroid Lightcurve Database (LCDB), query form (info )
 Asteroids with Satellites, Robert Johnston, johnstonsarchive.net
 Dictionary of Minor Planet Names, Google books
 Asteroids and comets rotation curves, CdR Observatoire de Geneve, Raoul Behrend
 
 
 

001866
Discoveries by Paul Wild (Swiss astronomer)
Named minor planets
001866
001866
19721205